The Ferrari 333 SP is a sports prototype race car that was built by Italian race car manufacturer Dallara and later Michelotto to compete in the World Sports Car championship for Ferrari. Unveiled at the end of 1993, at the behest of amateur racer Giampiero Moretti (owner of the MOMO auto parts business), the 333 SP marked Ferrari's official return to sports car racing after a 20-year absence. The car was built to compete in the IMSA's new WSC class, which replaced the previous GTP cars.

A total of 40 chassis were built, the first 14 by Dallara and the remaining 26 by Michelotto. It is believed that 27 chassis were raced, between 1994 and 2003.

Development
While the 333 SP was in its planning stages, Ferrari contracted Italian motor racing manufacturer Dallara to assist with its development. Dallara provided the transmission and suspension, and were also responsible for aerodynamic development and bodywork construction. The gearbox used Hewland mechanical parts, housed within a custom-built Dallara casing. Ferrari developed the chassis tub and engine in-house. British race car engineering consultant Tony Southgate joined the project in early 1994 and went on to help design and run the cars until the end of 1995.

Southgate later described it as "one of the most reliable race engines I have ever worked with."

Racing career
The car debuted in the third round of the 1994 IMSA GT Championship at Road Atlanta, securing the first two places. Four cars were allocated to three teams, Euromotorsport, Momo Corse, and Team Scandia. In the following round, at Lime Rock, the Italian cars monopolized the podium, and would take three more wins until the end of the season. However, due to Ferrari starting the season late, they were beaten by Oldsmobile to the makes' championship, and Andy Evans was the best placed Ferrari driver at fifth in the drivers' championship.

In 1995, the 333 SP took its revenge. Although proving unreliable at the 24 Hours of Daytona, it took top honors at the 12 Hours of Sebring before securing another four wins. With the four cars taking more consistent results, Ferrari won the makes championship and Fermín Velez won the drivers title, with Mauro Baldi and Wayne Taylor taking third and fourth, respectively.

The following year the car was still competitive and tied with Oldsmobile in the constructors championship but lost on a tie-breaker, as well as allowing ex-F1 driver Max Papis to score a final second place and Didier Theys a fourth in the drivers championship, even though the 333 SP won only two races. In 1997, the Ferrari won again at Sebring and took another four wins. However, the car was losing its competitiveness against the more modern Riley & Scott, and taking 4th, 5th and 6th in the drivers championship and second in the makes was the best it could with a four-year-old design.

In 1998, the car was slightly updated, and found new life in the International Sports Racing Series (later called FIA Sportscar Championship), winning every race and scoring the championship's two top spots with the winners Emmanuel Collard and Vincenzo Sospiri and runners-up Didier Theys and Fredy Lienhard. In America, the car won three rounds in the IMSA Championship (including Sebring) and took Wayne Taylor to second in the final standings while Ferrari won the makes championship. In the rival USRRC Can-Am championship, the 333 SP finally managed to take the Daytona 24 Hours crown.

Starting from 1999, the car found its niche in the European races, as the newly introduced American Le Mans Series saw factory-backed Audi and BMW entries dominating against privateer Ferraris. The cars were consistently outclassed in the ALMS races, and in 2000 Doran Racing even fit a Judd engine in an attempt to stay competitive. However, across the Atlantic, the 333 SP was the car to own, and in 1999, Collard and Sospiri renewed their ISRS title, edging out Christian Pescatori, who won the following year, with David Terrien, making it three championships in a row for the JMB Racing-entered Ferrari.

As the 333 SP became outdated in chassis, engine and aerodynamics, it gradually disappeared from international sports car racing. In 2001, no Ferrari prototype raced in the ALMS, although the Risi Competizione car made a few appearances in Grand-Am and Doran Racing's Judd-powered chassis won the 2001 6 Hours of Watkins Glen, while in Europe, Marco Zadra won the FIA Sportscar Championship but the car was not as dominant as it had once been.

In 2002, the 333 SP was absent from the championship, but made a few appearances the following year, powered by a Judd engine, at the hands of Giovanni Lavaggi's GLV-Brums team. The 333 SP's final appearance was at the 2003 500km of Monza.

Complete IMSA GT Championship results

References

External links

Mulsanne's Corner - Ferrari 333 SP technical
World Sports Racing Prototypes - Ferrari 333 SP chassis index
Racing Sports Cars - Ferrari 333 SP results

333 SP
Le Mans Prototypes
24 Hours of Le Mans race cars
Sports prototypes
333 P